Edgars Jeromanovs (born April 18, 1986) is a professional Latvian basketball player who plays the point guard position. He is currently playing for BK Jūrmala of the Latvian Basketball League.

He has represented the Latvian national team in EuroBasket 2011.

References

External links
 FIBA Europe profile

1986 births
Living people
BK Jūrmala players
BK Liepājas Lauvas players
BK VEF Rīga players
BK Ventspils players
Latvian men's basketball players
MBC Mykolaiv players
Norrköping Dolphins players
People from Saldus
Point guards